The Pikeville Bears program is a college football team that represents the University of Pikeville in the Mid-South Conference, a part of the NAIA.  The team has had 4 head coaches since its first recorded football game in 2000. The current coach is Corey Fipps who first took the position for the 2021 season.

Key

Coaches

Notes

References

Lists of college football head coaches

Kentucky sports-related lists